Nationality words link to articles with information on the nation's poetry or literature (for instance, Irish or France).

Events

Works published
1425:
 Antonio Beccadelli, Hermaphroditus, a collection of 81 Latin epigrams
 Alain Chartier, La Belle Dame sans Merci; France

1429:
 Christine de Pisan, Le Ditie de Jehanne d'Arc, France

Births
Death years link to the corresponding "[year] in poetry" article:

1420:
 Martial d'Auvergne, French poet
 Giovanni Mattia Tabarino, born about this year (died 1500), Italian, Latin-language poet
 Jean Meschinot (died 1491), French

1421:
 Sōgi 宗祇 (died 1502), Japanese Zen monk who studied waka and renga poetry, then became a professional renga poet in his 30s

1422:
 Anthony Woodville born about this year (died 1483), English poet and translator

1423:
 Alfonso de Palencia (died 1492), Castilian pre-Renaissance historian, writer, and poet

1424:
 Cristoforo Landino (died 1498), Italian, Latin-language poet
 Bonino Mombrizio (died 1482/1502), Italian, Latin-language poet
 Tito Vespasiano Strozzi born this year or in 1425 (died 1505), Italian, Latin-language poet

1425:
 Basinio da Parma (died 1457), Italian, Latin-language poet
 Tito Vespasiano Strozzi born this year or in 1424 (died 1505), Italian, Latin-language poet

1426:
 Suster Bertken born this year or 1427 (died 1514), Dutch
 Bhalam born about this year (died 1500), Indian, Gujarati-language poet
 Jalaladdin Davani (died 1502), Iranian philosopher, theologian, jurist and poet
 Giovanni Mario Filelfo (died 1480), Italian, Latin-language poet
 Olivier de la Marche (died 1501 or 1502), French poet and chronicler

1427:
 Suster Bertken born this year or 1426 (died 1514), Dutch
 Galeotto Marzio, born this year or 1428 (died 1494/1497), Italian, Latin-language poet
 Francesco Rolandello (died 1490), Italian, Latin-language poet

1428:
 Galeotto Marzio born this year or 1427 (died 1494/1497), Italian, Latin-language poet

1429:
 Giannantonio Campano (died 1477), Italian, Latin-language poet
 Giovanni Gioviano Pontano, also known as "Iovianus Pontanus" (died 1503), Italian, Latin-language poet
 Niccolò Perotti, also known as "Perotto" or "Nicolaus Perottus", born 1430 (died 1480), according to some sources, or this year, according to others, or either year, according to still others) Italian humanist, translator, author of one of the first modern Latin school grammars, and Latin-language poet

Deaths
Birth years link to the corresponding "[year] in poetry" article:

1420:
 Giolla na Naomh Ó hUidhrín, Irish historian, topographer and poet

1423:
 Anselm Turmeda, also known as "Abd-Allah at-Tarjuman" عبد الله الترجمان (born 1355), a poet who wrote in both Catalan Spanish and, after converting to Islam, in Arabic
 Andrew of Wyntoun, also known as Andrew Wyntoun (born 1350), Scottish poet, a canon and prior
 Hugo von Montfort (born 1357), Austrian minstrel and representative of the German Minnesang (songwriters and poets)

1425:
 Jordi de Sant Jordi, died about this year (born late 1390s) Chamberlain at the court of King Alfons V of Aragon (Alfons III of Valencia), but better known for his poetry

1426:
 John Audelay, also spelled "John Awdelay", died about this year (birth year unknown), English priest and poet who wrote in a Staffordshire dialect of Middle English
 Süleyman Çelebi (born 1377), Turkish poet
 Thomas Hoccleve, died between March and May (born about 1368), English poet

See also

 Poetry
 15th century in poetry
 15th century in literature

Notes

15th-century poetry
Poetry